Pleasantville is a community located in the Town of Whitchurch–Stouffville, Ontario, Canada.

It is a small hamlet consisting of mainly farms, residential homes and horse ranches. Pleasantville was originally settled by Quakers from Pennsylvania in the early nineteenth century.

Pleasantville is situated east of Highway 404 and can be reached from Vivian Sideroad (Mulock Drive) by driving north on Woodbine Avenue.

References 

Communities in Whitchurch-Stouffville